Data degradation is the gradual corruption of computer data due to an accumulation of non-critical failures in a data storage device. The phenomenon is also known as data decay, data rot or bit rot.

Example
Below are several digital images illustrating data degradation, all consisting of 326,272 bits. The original photo is displayed first. In the next image, a single bit was changed from 0 to 1. In the next two images, two and three bits were flipped. On Linux systems, the binary difference between files can be revealed using  command (e.g. ).

Primary storages 
Data degradation in dynamic random-access memory (DRAM) can occur when the electric charge of a bit in DRAM disperses, possibly altering program code or stored data. DRAM may be altered by cosmic rays or other high-energy particles. Such data degradation is known as a soft error. ECC memory can be used to mitigate this type of data degradation.

Secondary storages

Data degradation results from the gradual decay of storage media over the course of years or longer. Causes vary by medium:
 Solid-state media, such as EPROMs, flash memory and other solid-state drives, store data using electrical charges, which can slowly leak away due to imperfect insulation. The chip itself is not affected by this, so reprogramming it approximately once per decade prevents decay. An undamaged copy of the master data is required for the reprogramming.
 Magnetic media, such as hard disk drives, floppy disks and magnetic tapes, may experience data decay as bits lose their magnetic orientation. Periodic refreshing by rewriting the data can alleviate this problem. In warm/humid conditions these media, especially those poorly protected against ambient air, are prone to the physical decomposition of the storage medium.
 Optical media, such as CD-R, DVD-R and BD-R, may experience data decay from the breakdown of the storage medium. This can be mitigated by storing discs in a dark, cool, low humidity location. "Archival quality" discs are available with an extended lifetime, but are still not permanent. However, data integrity scanning that measures the rates of various types of errors is able to predict data decay on optical media well ahead of uncorrectable data loss occurring.
 Paper media, such as punched cards and punched tape, may literally rot. Mylar punched tape is another approach that does not rely on electromagnetic stability.

Hardware failures
Most disk, disk controller and higher-level systems are subject to a slight chance of unrecoverable failure. With ever-growing disk capacities, file sizes, and increases in the amount of data stored on a disk, the likelihood of the occurrence of data decay and other forms of uncorrected and undetected data corruption increases.

Low-level disk controllers typically employ error correction codes (ECC) to correct erroneous data.

Higher-level software systems may be employed to mitigate the risk of such underlying failures by increasing redundancy and implementing integrity checking, error correction codes and self-repairing algorithms. The ZFS file system was designed to address many of these data corruption issues. The Btrfs file system also includes data protection and recovery mechanisms, as does ReFS.

See also

 Checksum
 Database integrity
 Data curation
 Data preservation
 Data scrubbing
 Digital permanence
 Digital preservation
 Disc rot
 Error detection and correction
 Link rot
 Media preservation
 RAR archive file format has optional recovery
 PAR2 recovery file format

References

Computer jargon
Data quality